The John P. Robarts Research Library, commonly referred to as Robarts Library, is the main humanities and social sciences library of the University of Toronto Libraries and the largest individual library in the university. Opened in 1973 and named for John Robarts, the 17th Premier of Ontario, the library contains more than 4.5 million bookform items, 4.1 million microform items and 740,000 other items.

The library building is one of the most significant examples of brutalist architecture in North America. Its towering main structure rests on an equilateral triangular footprint and features extensive use of triangular geometric patterns throughout. It forms the main component of a three-tower complex that also includes the Thomas Fisher Rare Book Library and the Claude T. Bissell Building, which houses the Faculty of Information. The library's imposing appearance has earned it the nicknames Fort Book and The Peacock/Turkey.

Architecture

The design of the Robarts Library complex was headed by Mathers & Haldenby Architects with consultation from Warner, Burns, Toan & Lunde, the New York architectural firm whose earlier works included the libraries at Cornell and Brown universities and who specialized in precast concrete buildings. Coinciding with the Canadian Centennial celebrations, the initial plan was expanded to add three more storeys to the original design. Construction of the library began in 1968 and completed in 1973, at a cost of over $40 million.

Robarts Library occupies a  site on a field of open space and mature tree cover. The building is oriented such that one side of the equilateral triangle faces west while the other two sides face northeast and southeast. From the southeast corner, the building appears as a peacock.

The elevation is mostly concrete, albeit differing in textures and directionality: smooth concrete lines the façade in a horizontal manner, the rough concrete lining vertically. The steel-framed windows are situated onto the bays protruding from the façade, and are reminiscent of overhanging towers in medieval castle architecture. The bay windows seem to elevate upwards, opening up the two lowermost levels into voids enclosed with steel-framed glazing, making these elements seem lighter than they really are. To stretch further one's imagination, it is as if these elements are elevators that transport the "scholar[s] anxious to escape the noise and turmoil of the vulgar press [into]… a dream palace enshrining in its holy mysteries the power of the word."

Comprising fourteen storeys, plus two underground floors, the brutalist and futurist structure features raised podia and a suspended fourth floor. A mezzanine level physically connects Robarts Library to the Thomas Fisher Rare Book Library building at its southeastern side, and to the Claude T. Bissell Building, housing the Faculty of Information, at its northeastern side. The concrete waffle slab floor plates are adorned with triangular-patterned tessellation. A hexagonal central circulation atrium is enclosed at the core of the building and through the middle of the mezzanine level.

In 2008, the university announced that Robarts Library would be receiving a significant upgrade, the first phase of which was completed in the spring of 2011. During these years a major transformation gradually took place at Robarts, beginning with the renovation of the apexes on each stack floor in 2008 (finished in 2010), the Map & Data Library on the 5th floor in 2009, the Media Commons on the 3rd floor in 2010, and the second floor porticos in 2011. The renovations were intended to create a welcoming environment that would both provide informal study space and function to let people know about the services and resources available throughout the building. Signage throughout the building was redesigned and refreshed to improve navigation and usability of the library and its resources, and new touch screens are already improving communication with students, providing information such as the number of available workstations on each floor at any given time. Robarts outdoor signage can be scanned with the smartphone app Layar for augmented reality links.

The next phase of the renewal will be the addition of a five-storey pavilion which will become a new face of Robarts, opening up the west side of the building to the street, bringing a flood of natural light to the lower floors and making the overall environment more inviting, accessible and productive for students. The new Pavilion is anticipated to add 1,200 new work and study spaces to Robarts, bringing the library's total number of study spaces to over 6,000. The renovations were designed by Diamond and Schmitt Architects Incorporated.

Features and collections

A 1974 article in the Canadian Architect magazine outlines the library's significance to serving a campus community the size of a town, as well as by being a central storage for humankind's recorded thoughts and inspiration. The library was initially intended for use by graduate students only, but following a student protest that included an illegal occupation of the building, undergraduate students were also granted access. The library's initial design was for a mechanical book conveyor belt system to allow for faster collection by library staff, who would then send books downstairs for pickup. After Robarts was opened to all students, the conveyor system was discarded, although the tracks used by the conveyor system are still visible above the shelves. The library is open only to current students, faculty, and staff, external researchers, associate members, and alumni with paid privileges, as well as members of the University of Toronto School community. It is closed to members of the public.

The building houses a number of special collections, including the Mu Collection (Chinese: 慕氏藏書) which is a set of rare books from China in the Cheng Yu Tung East Asian Library, the largest research collection for Hong Kong and Canada-Hong Kong studies outside of Hong Kong at the Richard Charles Lee Canada-Hong Kong Library, and a sizable collection in Russian, Polish, Czech and Slovak, Ukrainian, and other East European languages at the Petro Jacyk Central & East European Resource Centre.

In addition to an extensive collection of texts, the library provides limited after-hours study space to students during the academic year with the exception of weekends. The book stacks are off-limits after hours. In August 2010, the Adaptive Technology Resource Centre moved from the first floor of Robarts Library to OCAD University, which is shared with students with disabilities from that college, as well as from nearby Ryerson University and Seneca College. The Internet Archive Canada headquarters are located on the seventh floor.

In popular culture
Robarts Library may have served as a model for the secret library in Umberto Eco's The Name of the Rose. Eco spent much of the time writing the novel at the University of Toronto, and the stairwell of the secret library bears a particularly strong resemblance to that in Robarts Library.

Robarts was used for exterior shots of the prison setting in Resident Evil: Afterlife. The entire building is visible numerous times, having been digitally edited and transplanted from its downtown Toronto location to Los Angeles. In the film, it has been surrounded by a prison wall and hundreds of thousands of zombies. While the exterior retains its triangular shape, the interior is rectangular.

References

External links

Robarts Library
Forty Years of "Fort Book": The Story of Robarts Library

Brutalist architecture in Canada
University of Toronto libraries
University of Toronto buildings
Library buildings completed in 1973
Libraries established in 1973
1973 establishments in Canada